Odai may refer to:

 Ōdai, Mie
 Odăi
 Uday